Jake Donaghey (born 6 December 1994) is an Australian sprint canoeist. At the 2012 Summer Olympics, he competed in the Men's C-1 1000 metres.

References

Australian male canoeists
Living people
Olympic canoeists of Australia
Canoeists at the 2012 Summer Olympics
1994 births
21st-century Australian people